Gymnopilus alienus is a species of mushroom in the family Hymenogastraceae. It was given its current name by American mycologist Murrill in 1917.

See also

 List of Gymnopilus species

References

External links
Index Fungorum

alienus
Taxa named by Charles Horton Peck